Sweet 75 is the only studio album by alternative rock band Sweet 75, released on August 26, 1997, through DGC.

Track listing
All songs composed by Yva Las Vegass and Krist Novoselic, except where noted.

 "Fetch" (Yva Las Vegas) – 3:40
 "Lay Me Down" (Yva Las Vegas) – 3:28
 "Bite My Hand" – 2:25
 "Red Dress" (Yva Las Vegas) – 3:19
 "La Vida" (Yva Las Vegas) – 3:38
 "Six Years" – 3:43
 "Take Another Stab" – 5:13
 "Poor Kitty" – 2:41
 "Ode to Dolly" – 2:51
 "Dogs" (Krist Novoselic) – 3:34
 "Cantos de Pilon" (traditional) – 2:36
 "Nothing" – 5:33
 "Japan Trees" – 2:28
 "Oral Health" – 4:49

Personnel
 Yva Las Vegas – vocals; bass (tracks 1-3, 6-9, 12-14), guitar (tracks 4, 5, 10, 11), cuatro (track 5)
 Krist Novoselic – guitar (tracks 1-3, 6-9, 12-14), bass (tracks 4, 5, 10), accordion (track 11)
 William Rieflin – percussion (tracks 1, 3-10, 12-14), piano (track 11)
 Paul Fox – Mellotron (tracks 1, 4), orchestron (track 2), folding field organ (track 14)
 Adam Wade – percussion (track 2)
 Greg Adams – trumpet (tracks 5, 10), horn arrangement (tracks 5, 10)
 Chuck Findley – trumpet (tracks 5, 10)
 Nick Lane – trombone (tracks 5, 10)
 Brandon Fields – saxophone (tracks 5, 10)
 Herb Alpert – trumpet solo (track 5)
 Arisa  Romero – additional vocals (track 5)
 Peter Buck – mandolin (track 11)

References

1997 debut albums
Albums produced by Paul Fox (record producer)
DGC Records albums
Sweet 75 albums